Pakistan has coal deposits in Sindh, Punjab and Baluchistan provinces. The total coal resources there are reported to be approximately 185 billion tonnes.

Regions

Duki

Duki is in Balochistan. It is rich with high-quality coal with the highest rate of extraction in Pakistan. Coal is the main business in the area. More than 80% of the local population are directly involved in the coal business. The coal business is entirely in private hands, although only individuals and not companies are the owners.

Almost all Pushtun tribes in Duki including Nasar, Tareen and Luni participate. The Nasar tribe has a large share, and is considered to be the master miners and businessmen. In the 2010s, the local coal tycoons were Sardar Akbar Khan, Nasar Kamalkhail, Sardar Masoom Khan Tareen and Tekadar Atha Muhammad Nasar.

In the Duki district coal is mainly under the control of the mine owners, the Petti Tekadars, and the coal agents. The mine owners are either land owners or hold extraction rights. Ownership is held by only a few families, mainly the sardars of different tribes. Petti Tekkadars do not own mines, rather they license them from the owners. Many Petti Tekaddars work in Dukki Tehsil. Coal agents help transport coal to other cities by becoming middlemen. At least 3,000 metric tons of coal are transported to Punjab province. The coal is mainly used in brick kilns and other factories such as textile and cement. The width of the coal seams vary from 6 inches to 9 feet.

On average 1000 coal mines operate with turnover of Rs.50 million daily.

Duki is the best private mining valley in Pakistan. More than 50% of the labor is from Afghanistan.

khora 

Kingri sub-Tehsil of Musakhel District is located on the borders of Punjab Province. In the early 1980s coal exploration started, but ended due to poor roads. In President Musharraf's regime, the roads from Fort Minro to Kingri were improved. The area hosts two streams, one from Chamalang and one from Duki. The coal-bearing areas are supportive of mining. Fifty plus mines are now operating there. Aram in Kingri has excellent coal and charcoal reserves, available at a depth of 30 feet. The specifications of Kingri coal areas:

Thar 
Pakistan's largest coal reserves are found in Sindh, measuring approximately 175 billion tonnes. Tharparkar division of Sindh is said to host huge deposits.

See also 

Pakistan Chrome Mines Ltd
Ghani Mines Pvt Ltd
Karak, Pakistan
Reko Diq
Baghalchur
Salt Range
Loralai
Khewra Salt Mines
Atomic City of Pakistan
Coal in Duki, Pakistan

References 
Pakistan's largest coal trader

Further reading 
 Thar Coal Resources Ministry of Petroleum & Natural Resources Pakistan
  Pakistan Coal Power Potential

Coal in Pakistan
Coal mines in Pakistan